Chase Harrison (born April 2, 1984 in Huntington, West Virginia) is an American soccer player who most recently played for Philadelphia Union in Major League Soccer.

Career

College and Amateur
Harrison attended Huntington High School and played college soccer at Virginia Tech from 2002 to 2005. In four seasons he appeared in 79 matches, registering 289 saves, 24 shutouts, and a GAA of 1.12. During his college years he also played with the West Virginia Chaos in the USL Premier Development League.

Professional
Harrison was drafted in the third round (26th overall) of the 2006 MLS Supplemental Draft by Real Salt Lake. He was loaned to the Virginia Beach Mariners in March 2006, and played two games for the team, before being waived by RSL at the end of the 2006 season without playing a senior game.

He signed for Rochester Raging Rhinos in May 2007. On July 9, 2008, the Rhinos sent Harrison and Jamil Walker, recently acquired from the Carolina RailHawks, to the Portland Timbers in exchange for Andrew Gregor.

Harrison signed for Harrisburg City Islanders in March 2009. On February 18, 2010 Crystal Palace Baltimore announced the signing of Harrison to a contract for the 2010 season.

On September 9, 2010, Harrison was added to the D.C. United roster following the release of Andrew Quinn, who underwent knee surgery. On October 26, the Columbus Crew signed Harrison to a short-term contract to backup Andy Gruenebaum in the postseason after starting goalkeeper William Hesmer suffered a right shoulder fracture.

Harrison signed with Harrisburg City Islanders, now playing in the USL Pro league, on March 16, 2011.

Harrison was signed by Philadelphia Union on September 23, 2011 to replace injured goalkeeper Thorne Holder as a backup. At season's end, the club declined his 2012 contract option and he entered the 2011 MLS Re-Entry Draft. Harrison was not selected in the draft and became a free agent; however, Philadelphia re-signed him just before the start of the 2012 season.

Harrison remained with Philadelphia through the 2012 season. After the conclusion of the 2012 season, Philadelphia declined the 2013 option on Harrison's contract and he entered the 2012 MLS Re-Entry Draft. He became a free agent after going undrafted in both rounds of the draft.

References

External links
Harrisburg City Islanders bio

1984 births
Living people
American soccer players
West Virginia Chaos players
Real Salt Lake players
Virginia Beach Mariners players
Rochester New York FC players
Portland Timbers (2001–2010) players
Penn FC players
Crystal Palace Baltimore players
Richmond Kickers players
D.C. United players
Columbus Crew players
Philadelphia Union players
Association football goalkeepers
Sportspeople from Huntington, West Virginia
Soccer players from West Virginia
USL League Two players
USL First Division players
USL Second Division players
USSF Division 2 Professional League players
USL Championship players
Major League Soccer players
Virginia Tech Hokies men's soccer players
Real Salt Lake draft picks
Huntington High School (West Virginia) alumni